Edward McGregor Lennie OAM JP (born 5 October 1959) is a retired Australian association football referee. He is best known for officiating at the 1998 FIFA World Cup and the 1996 Olympic Games.

Refereeing career
Lennie began refereeing in Scotland, before emigrating to Australia in 1985.

1998 World Cup
Lennie refereed two matches at the 1998 FIFA World Cup in France.

National Soccer League
Lennie refereed 195 National Soccer League matches before retiring in 2004.

Honours
Medal of the Order of Australia: 2008
Centenary Medal: 2006
Football Federation Australia - Football Hall of Fame Hall of Honour Inductee: 2007
Football Hall of Fame Western Australia Hall of Recognition Inductee: 2005.
NSL Referee of the Year:1994/95, 1995/96
Western Australian State League Referee of the Year: 1993, 1994, 1995, 1997

Post-football career
His current occupation is the Referee Development Manager for Football West and is also an elite referees assessor for the Asian Football Confederation and FIFA.

Political career
In December 2012 Lennie was preselected by WA Labor for the Western Australian Legislative Assembly seat of Scarborough. He subsequently ran for the Hamersley Ward at the City of Stirling elections in October 2013.

References

1959 births
Living people
Australian soccer referees
FIFA World Cup referees
1998 FIFA World Cup referees
Olympic football referees